Teng Yu-hsien (Hakka: Then Yí-hièn; 21 July 1906 – 11 June 1944) was a Taiwanese Hakka musician. He is noted for composing many well-known Hokkien songs. Teng gave himself a Japanese-style pen-name as Karasaki Yau  and a formal name called Higashida Gyōu . Teng is regarded as the Father of Taiwanese folk songs.

Biography 
Teng Yu-hsien was born in Ryūtan, Tōshien Chō (modern-day Longtan, Taoyuan) of Japanese-ruled Taiwan. He migrated to Daitotei (Twatutia) with his family when he was three years old. In 1914, Teng joined Bangka Public School (艋舺公學校). He graduated in 1920, and subsequently entered the Taihoku Normal School (modern-day National Taipei University of Education). In 1925, Teng graduated and became a teacher of the Nishin Public School (日新公學校). After he married Chung You-mei (鍾有妹) in 1926, he departed from his teaching job and went to Japan to study composition theory in the Tokyo Music Academy.

Teng returned to Taiwan in 1930, then served as a translator in Taichū District Court. In 1932, he was invited by Wen-sheng Records (文聲唱片) to compose the March of the Daitotei (大稻埕行進曲), a Japanese popular song which was thought to be lost, until it was rediscovered by a collector in 2007. Later, he was interested in Columbia Records, an early disc company in Taiwan, and was invited by Tan Kun-giok, a songwriter that served as an officer of the Columbia Records. In 1933, Teng composed several well-known Hokkien songs such as Bang Chhun Hong (望春風) and Goat Ia Chhiu (月夜愁).

He created a representative work U Ia Hoe (雨夜花) in 1934, a song that depicts the mood of a fictional pathetic woman. Between 1934 and 1937, Teng composed many other songs include the Moa Bin Chhun Hong (滿面春風) and Su Kui Hong (四季紅). After the World War II occurred in 1937, the Japanese government began to reinforce the influence of Japanese culture, and thus suppressed the development of the Taiwanese Hokkien songs. Many of the songs that were composed by Teng were banned, and some were rewritten into Japanese language.

In 1939, the Pacific War intensified, thus Teng resigned from his job and fled to Kyūrin Village of Shinchiku Prefecture (modern-day Qionglin, Hsinchu) with his family, then served as a teacher in the Kyūrin Public School . His health situation was gradually getting worse at that time, but he still composed some Japanese songs. At that time, Teng adopted two Japanese names: Karasaki Yosame and Higashida Gyōu. On 11 June 1944, he died from lung disease and heart disorder. Asteroid 255989 Dengyushian, discovered by Taiwanese astronomers Chi Sheng Lin and Ye Quan-Zhi in 2006, was named in his honor. The official  was published by the Minor Planet Center on 12 October 2011.

List of composition works

References

External links 

 An introduction written in Chinese

Taiwanese composers
Han Taiwanese
Taiwanese people of Hakka descent
1906 births
1944 deaths
Musicians from Taoyuan City
20th-century composers
Hakka musicians